These R the Tales is the seventh album released by rapper, Andre Nickatina. It was released on November 14, 2000, for Fillmoe Coleman Records and was produced by Andre Nickatina, Nick Peace, Juilan Piccolo, Laird, Smoov-E, DJ Pause and the Fillmoe Coleman Band (Black Diamond & Tebo). Fellow Bay Area rapper, San Quinn makes an appearance on the album.

Track listing
"These R the Tales" - 5:13
"Cherrybananapumpkinpie" - 3:13
"Rose" - 3:04 (Ft. Tim Parker)
"Smoke Dope & Rap [Live]" - 2:35
"One Ticket Please" - 2:50
"ɨ¢ε ¢ʀεαɱ" - 1:47
"Fine Ass Bartender" - 3:36
"Born in the Big City" - 4:15 (Ft. Lolo Swift)
"Saw A Gangsta Cry" - 4:39 (Ft. San Quinn)
"Shere Khan" - 1:47
"Candy Rain" - 1:43
"Live @ The Daiquiri Factory" - 4:04
"Gang Bang Heaven" - 2:58
"The Ave." [Remix] - 3:33
"Glorified" - 3:15
"Sey Hey" - 2:32 (Ft. E-Daddy)

2000 albums
Andre Nickatina albums